Richard Krajicek defeated Yevgeny Kafelnikov in the final, 6–4, 6–3, 6–3 to win the singles tennis title at the 1998 Eurocard Open.

Petr Korda was the defending champion, but lost in the second round to Thomas Johansson.

Seeds
A champion seed is indicated in bold text while text in italics indicates the round in which that seed was eliminated. All sixteen seeds received a bye into the second round.

Draw

Finals

Top half

Section 1

Section 2

Bottom half

Section 3

Section 4

External links
 ATP – Main draw

Singles